The Saldaña River is a river of Colombia. It drains into the Caribbean Sea via the Magdalena River.

See also
List of rivers of Colombia

References
Rand McNally, The New International Atlas, 1993.

Rivers of Colombia
Magdalena River